Echinopsis mamillosa is a species of cactus from Bolivia.

Description

The flowers are white with rose tips.

Two subspecies are recognized. Subspecies silvatica is taller and has fewer ribs.

Taxonomy

Echinopsis mamillosa was first described in 1907 by the German botanist Max Gürke. E. silvatica F.Ritter was included in E. mamillosa as the subspecies silvatica by Pierre Braun and E. Esteves Pereira in 1995. The circumscription of Echinopsis remains controversial; the genus is accepted not to be monophyletic.

References

Cacti of South America
Flora of Bolivia
mamillosa
Plants described in 1907